Lyle Kessler is an American playwright, screenwriter and actor, best known internationally for his 1983 play Orphans.

Career

Actor
Born in Philadelphia, Kessler began his career as an actor. His first professional appearance was in the Philadelphia premiere of the play Waiting for Godot, appearing opposite Bruce Dern. He has subsequently appeared in several films, including James Dean (portraying Lee Strasberg, under whom he had studied at the Actors Studio).

Writer and director
Kessler studied acting with Lee Strasberg and was accepted into the Director's Unit of the Actors Studio, where he wrote and directed his first one act play, The Viewing, which he subsequently directed at the Lucille Lortel Theater in New York.

Playwright
Kessler's most well known plays include his first full-length work, The Watering Place, and Orphans.

The Watering Place (written in 1969) premiered on Broadway and starred Shirley Knight and William Devane.

Orphans (1983) was directed by Gary Sinise and opened at Chicago's Steppenwolf Theatre before starting its successful Off Broadway run. Albert Finney won the Olivier Award for his performance in the London West End production of Orphans.

Kessler's other plays include:
Perp (2019) premiering at The Barrow Group in March 2019, directed by Lee Brock
House on Fire (2018) which premiered at Palm Beach Dramaworks, directed by Bill Hayes
Robbers (1987) which has been performed at the Long Wharf Theatre in New Haven, Connecticut starring Judd Hirsch
Possession (1976) which was premiered by the Ensemble Studio Theatre, directed by James Hammerstein.
Unlisted which was performed at the Tiffany Theatre in Los Angeles starring Charles Robinson.
Burning Bright
The Family Circle
The Engagement
The Viewing (production 1967, Theatre de Lys)

Kessler was awarded a Rockefeller Foundation Playwriting Grant for his play The Watering Place and won the New York State Council on the Arts Playwriting Award for his play Burning Bright.

His plays have been published by Random House, Grove Press and Samuel French Inc.

Films
Kessler's play Orphans has been made into a film of the same name. Directed by Alan J. Pakula, the film version of Orphans starred Matthew Modine and Albert Finney.

He has also written:
The Saint of Fort Washington, for which he was executive producer.
Gladiator
Touched, in which he also acted.

Other activities
Kessler and his wife, actress Margaret Ladd, are founders of the Imagination Workshop located at the UCLA Neuropsychiatric Institute. This workshop brings together actors, writers and directors who create scenes and original plays to be performed by psychiatric patients, veterans and "at risk" students in the L.A Public Schools. In 1998 they won the Ovation Award "for their excellence in using theatre to impact and involve a community."

Kessler and Mark Rydell co-moderate the Writer/Directors Unit of the Actors Studio West at Greenway Court Theatre. Kessler served as the Director of the Sundance Screenwriter's Lab. He also participated in the Sundance Screenwriters Conference in Hungary, working with writers from all over Eastern Europe.

Professional seminar
In 2009, Kessler, working with actor Martin Landau and director Mark Rydell, have teamed up to produce an education seminar, the Total Picture Seminar, a two-day event covering the disciplines of acting, directing and writing for film.

Notes

External links

The Total Picture Seminar – A Seminar with Martin Landau, Mark Rydell, and Lyle Kessler covering filmmaking

Actors Studio alumni
American dramatists and playwrights
American male dramatists and playwrights
American male screenwriters
American people of German descent
Living people
Writers from Philadelphia
Year of birth missing (living people)
Screenwriters from Pennsylvania